Pisarzowice  is a village in the administrative district of Gmina Lubań, within Lubań County, Lower Silesian Voivodeship, in south-western Poland.

The village has a population of 1,600. The name Pisarzowice is a calque of its older German name, Schreibersdorf (pisarz and Schreiber both meaning "writer").

References

Villages in Lubań County